Bronze Age swords appeared from around the 17th century BC, in the Black Sea region and the Aegean, as a further development of the dagger. They were replaced by iron swords during the early part of the 1st millennium BC.

From an early time the swords reached lengths in excess of 100 cm. The technology to produce blades of such lengths appears to have been developed in the Aegean, using  alloys of copper and tin or arsenic, around 1700 BC. Bronze Age swords were typically not longer than 80 cm; weapons significantly shorter than 60 cm are variously categorized as short swords or daggers. Before about 1400 BC swords remained mostly limited to the Aegean and southeastern Europe, but they became more widespread in the final centuries of the 2nd millennium BC, to Central Europe and Britain, to the Near East, Central Asia, Northern India and to China.

Predecessors

Before bronze, stone (such as flint and obsidian) was used as the primary material for edged cutting tools and weapons. Stone, however, is too brittle for long, thin implements such as swords. With the introduction of copper, and subsequently bronze, knives could be made longer, leading to the sword.

Thus, the development of the sword from the dagger was gradual, and in 2004 the first "swords" were claimed for the Early Bronze Age (c. 33rd to 31st centuries), based on finds at Arslantepe by Marcella Frangipane, professor of prehistory and protohistory of the Near and Middle East at Sapienza University of Rome. A cache of nine swords and daggers was found; they are made of an arsenic-copper alloy. Among them, three swords were inlaid with silver.

These are weapons of a total length of 45 to 60 cm which could be described as either short swords or long daggers. Some other similar swords have been found in Turkey, and are described by Thomas Zimmermann. An exceptionally well-preserved example, similar in construction to the Arslantepe swords, was discovered in 2017 in the Venetian Monastery of Lazarus.

The sword remained extremely rare for another millennium, and became more widespread only with the closing of the 3rd millennium. The "swords" of this later period can still readily be interpreted as daggers, as with the copper specimen from Naxos (dated roughly 2800 to 2300 BC), with a length of just below 36 cm, but individual specimens of the Cycladic "copper swords" of the period around 2300 reach a length up to 60 cm.  The first weapons that can unambiguously be classified as swords are those found in Minoan Crete, dated to about 1700 BC, which reach lengths of more than 100 cm. These are the "type A" swords of the Aegean Bronze Age.

Aegean

The Minoan and Mycenaean (Middle to Late Aegean Bronze Age) swords are classified in types labeled A to H following Sandars (1961, 1963), the "Sandars typology".
Types A and B ("tab-tang") are the earliest from about the 17th to 16th centuries, types C ("horned" swords) and D ("cross" swords) from the 15th century, types E and F ("T-hilt" swords) from the 13th and 12th.
The 13th to 12th centuries also see a revival of the "horned" type, classified as types G and H. Type H swords are associated with the Sea Peoples and were found in  Anatolia (Pergamon) and Greece.
Contemporary with types E to H is the so-called "Naue II" type, imported from south-eastern Europe.

Europe

One of the most important, and longest-lasting, types of prehistoric European swords was the "Naue II" type, named for Julius Naue who first described them and also known as "Griffzungenschwert" or "grip-tongue sword". It first appears in c. the 13th century BC in Northern Italy (or a general Urnfield background), and survived well into the Iron Age, with a life-span of about seven centuries, until the 6th century BC. During its lifetime the basic design was maintained, although the material changed from bronze to iron. Naue II swords were exported from Europe to the Aegean, and as far afield as Ugarit, beginning about 1200 BC, i.e. just a few decades before the final collapse of the palace cultures in the Bronze Age collapse. Naue II swords could be as long as 85 cm, but most specimens fall into the 60 to 70 cm range.

Swords from the Nordic Bronze Age appear from ca. the 17th century BC, often showing characteristic spiral patterns. The early Nordic swords are also comparatively short; a specimen discovered in 1912 near Bragby, Uppland, Sweden, dated to about 1800 to 1500 BC, was just over 60 cm long. This sword was, however, classified as of the  Hajdúsámson-Apa type, and was presumably imported. The Vreta Kloster sword discovered in 1897 (dated 1600 to 1500 BC) has a blade length (the hilt is missing) of 46 cm.

A typical variant for European swords is the "leaf shaped" blade, which was most common in North-west Europe at the end of the Bronze Age, on the British Isles in particular.
The "carp's tongue sword" is a type of bronze sword that was common to Western Europe during ca. the 9th to 8th centuries BC. The blade of the carp's tongue sword was wide and parallel for most of its length but the final third narrowed into a thin tip intended for thrusting. The design was probably developed in north-western France, and combined the broad blade useful for slashing with a thinner, elongated tip suitable for thrusting. Its advantages saw its adoption across Atlantic Europe. In Britain, the metalwork in the south east derived its name from this sword: the Carp's Tongue complex. Notable examples of this type were part of the Isleham Hoard.

The Bronze Age-style sword and construction methods died out at the end of the early Iron Age (Hallstatt D), around 600-500 BC, when swords were once again replaced by daggers in most of Europe. An exception is the xiphos from Greece, the development of which continued for several more centuries.

The "antenna sword", named for the pair of ornaments suggesting antennae on its hilt, is a type of the Late Bronze Age, continued in early iron swords of the East Hallstatt and Italy region.

China

Sword production in China is attested from the Bronze Age Shang dynasty, from roughly 1200 BC. The technology for bronze swords reached its high point during the Warring States period and Qin dynasty (221 BC – 207 BC). Amongst the Warring States period swords, some unique technologies were used, such as casting high-tin edges over softer, lower-tin cores, or the application of diamond shaped patterns on the blade (see the Sword of Gou Jian). Also unique for Chinese bronzes is the consistent use of high-tin bronze (17-21% tin), which is very hard and breaks under excess stress, whereas other cultures preferred lower tin bronze (usually 10%), which bends instead. China continued to make both iron and bronze swords longer than any other region; iron completely replaced bronze only in the early Han dynasty.

India

Swords have been recovered in archaeological findings of the Ochre Coloured Pottery culture throughout the Ganges-Yamuna Doab region of India, commonly made of copper, but in some instances made of bronze.  Diverse specimens have been discovered in Fatehgarh, where there are several varieties of hilt. These swords have been variously dated to periods between 1700-1400 BC, but were probably used more extensively during  1200-600 BC (Painted Grey Ware culture, Iron Age India).

See also
Bronze Age Europe
Håga Kurgan
Hassle
Yetholm-type shields
Iron Age sword

Notes

References
B. Athanassov, R. Krauß, V. Slavčev, 'A Bronze Sword of the Aegean-Anatolian Type in the Museum of Varna, Bulgaria' in: Horejs and Pavúk (eds.): Aegean and Balkan Prehistory (2012)
T. Bader,  Die Schwerter in Rumänien, Prähistorische Bronzefunde IV.8 (1991).
E. Cline, Aššuwa and the Achaeans: the 'Mycenaean' Sword at Hattušas and its possible Implications. Annual BSA 91, 1996, 137-151. 
John Evans, The Ancient Bronze Implements, Weapons and Ornaments, of Great Britain and Ireland (1881)
B. Hänsel, Bronzene Griffzungenschwerter aus Bulgarien. Prähist. Zeitschr. 45, 1970, 26-41. 
B. Hänsel,  'Frühe Bronzeschwerter zwischen dem Karpatenbecken und dem Werra-Tal' in:  Studia Antiquaria: Festschrift für Niels Bantelmann, 31–39.  
Imma Kilian-Dirlmeier, Die Schwerter in Griechenland (Außerhalb der Peloponnes), Bulgarien und Albanien, Prähistorische Bronzefunde IV.12 (1993).
A. Müller-Karpe, 'Anatolische Bronzeschwerter und Südosteuropa' In: C. Dobiat (ed.), Festschrift für Otto-Herman Frey, Marburger Studien zur Vor- und Frühgeschichte 16 (1994), 431-444.
S. Shalev, Redating the "Philistine sword" at the British Museum : a case study in typology and technology., Oxford Journal of Archaeology 7,3 (1988) 303-311. 
S. Shalev, Swords and daggers in Late Bronze Age Canaan, Prähistorische Bronzefunde, Franz Steiner Verlag, 2004.
N. K. Sandars, The First Aegean Swords and their Ancestry, American Journal of Archaeology  65 (1961), 17-29.
N. K. Sandars, Later Aegean Bronze Swords, American Journal of Archaeology 67 (1963),  117-153.
P. Schauer,  Die Schwerter in Süddeutschland, Österreich und der Schweiz I Prähistorische Bronzefunde IV.2 (1971).
R.F. Tylecote,  The early history of metallurgy in Europe (1987) 
H. Wüstemann,  Die Schwerter in Ostdeutschland, Prähistorische Bronzefunde IV.15 (2004).

External links

bronze-age-swords.com (Neil Burridge)
The Bronze Age Rapier by Dr Barry Molloy (2005)
Reproductions of bronze age swords  (1501bc.com)
From Rapier to Langsax: Sword Structure in the British Isles in the Bronze and Iron Ages by Niko Silvester (1995)
The Greek Age of Bronze: Swords/Daggers (salimbeti.com)
Nordic swords, spirals and the Dorian 
The Naue Type II Sword

Swords by period
Ancient swords
Bronze Age
Archaeological artefact types
Ancient Near East weapons
Bronze Age art
Ancient art in metal